Elizabeth Miranda (born June 29, 1981) is a Cape Verdean-American community organizer and politician. She is senator-elect for the Massachusetts Senate's 2nd Suffolk district after winning a five-way Democratic Primary Election, and advancing to an uncontested race in the 2022 Massachusetts general election. Since January 2019, Miranda has served as the Democratic Massachusetts State Representative for the Fifth Suffolk district. Her district comprises parts of the Dorchester and Roxbury neighborhoods of Boston. She is a member of the Massachusetts Black and Latino Legislative Caucus.

Miranda has passed legislation that aims to close racial disparities in maternal health outcomes of Black women, as well as legislation to advance environmental justice and was a lead author in the police reform omnibus legislation passed in 2021. In 2021, Miranda was named Best Politician by Boston Magazine and Progressive Legislator of the Year by Progressive Massachusetts.

Early life and education 
Miranda was born on June 29, 1981 in Roxbury, Boston. Her mother was a high school junior at the time of Miranda's birth, motivating her to drop out of education and begin to work to support her family.

Miranda is a graduate of the John D. O'Bryant High School of Math & Science in Roxbury. From 1998 to 2002, Miranda attended Wellesley College, from which she graduated after four years with a Bachelor of Arts in Africana studies and urban studies.

Miranda started her community organizing work as a teen organizer with Nubian Roots Youth Committee of the Dudley Street Neighborhood Association, working on vacant land issues and environmental justice.

Wellesley College's 143rd Commencement Speaker 
On June 4, 2021, Miranda returned to her alma mater, Wellesley College, to give the commencement address for the Class of 2021. She noted how she was only 1 of 16 Black women to serve in this capacity as the commencement speaker, noting, “I am now one of only 16 Black women who have ever graced this podium in 143 years of this address, joining trailblazers like Rep. Eleanor Holmes Norton, the first to bless this stage. Others who followed, like Maya Angelou, Anita Hill, Oprah, Toni Morrison, and Chimamanda Ngozi Adichie." Miranda spoke about her experience growing up in Roxbury and Dorchester,and she spoke about her grandfather, Manuel Goncalves Miranda, who came to Boston in pursuit of the American Dream in 1976 from the newly freed colony of Cabo Verde on the west coast of Africa after a war led by Amílcar Cabral against Portuguese colonial rule.

Prior to commencement day, Miranda supported a collective action led by students to push the college into allowing an official land acknowledgement to recognize the Indigenous people and land that Wellesley College was built upon. Successfully, students got the college to agree and for the first time ever.

Death of her brother 
On August 20, 2017, Miranda's 28-year-old brother, Michael A. Miranda, was shot and killed outside a nightclub in Boston's theater district. He was pronounced dead at 7:17 p.m. EST. This has inspired some of her campaign issues on stronger gun control, criminal justice reform, youth education (by introducing alternatives to violence) and the treatment of the distribution and oversight of firearms as a federal issue.

2018 State House campaign 
Citing President Trump's 2016 election as an important motivating factor, Miranda launched a campaign to seek the fifth Suffolk seat in the Massachusetts House of Representatives after the incumbent, Evandro Carvalho, opted not to run for reelection, launching instead an unsuccessful bid for the Democratic party's nomination in the position of Suffolk County district attorney.

She faced a largely contested Democratic primary, but garnered a total of 59.4 percent of the votes in a field of four declared candidates. In the general election, she faced Republican nominee Althea Garrison, a perennial candidate for the seat who had previously served as the district's representative from 1993 to 1995. Miranda won overwhelmingly in the general election, with 88.7 percent to Garrison's 11 percent. Subsequently, Miranda was sworn into the State House on January 2, 2019.

2022 State Senate campaign 

On December 9, 2021, Rep. Liz Miranda announced her campaign for State Senate of the 2nd Suffolk District, which was redistricted in 2021, becoming the seat of political power for Boston's black community. She announced after Senator Sonia Chang Diaz declared that she would be a candidate for Governor in 2022.

Winning 33% of the vote in fiercely contested Democratic primary, Liz Miranda defeated Nika Elugardo, Dianne Wilkerson, Miniard Culpepper, and James Grant on Tuesday, September 6, 2022. Liz Miranda earned a broad district-wide mandate—she secured at least 20% of the vote in 70 of the district’s 73 precincts in a 5-way race. Large portions of the neighborhoods are new to the Second Suffolk, which has been redrawn as a seat of political power for Black Boston.

She was endorsed by the Elect Black Women PAC, At-Large City Councilor Ruthzee Louijeune, District 7 City Councilor Tania Fernandes Anderson, Representative Liz Malia, the Boston Globe, Boston Carmens Union Local 589, the Environmental League of Massachusetts Action Fund, Boston's UNITE HERE Local 26, SEIU Local 509, Reproductive Equity NOW, National Association of Social Workers MA Chapter PACE, and the Massachusetts Nurses Association.

The new 2nd Suffolk District includes all of Roxbury with additional neighborhoods in Dorchester, Mattapan, Hyde Park, Mission Hill, Jamaica Plain, Roslindale, South End, and the Fenway.

In the general election, Miranda ran unopposed and was elected senator for the 2nd Suffolk District.

See also
 2019–2020 Massachusetts legislature
 2021–2022 Massachusetts legislature

References

People from Dorchester, Massachusetts
1981 births
Wellesley College alumni
Democratic Party members of the Massachusetts House of Representatives
Living people
African-American state legislators in Massachusetts
American politicians of Cape Verdean descent
21st-century American politicians
21st-century African-American politicians
20th-century African-American people